Robert William "Dabbs" Greer (April 2, 1917 – April 28, 2007) was an American character actor in film and television for over 60 years. With nearly 100 film roles and appearances in nearly 600 television episodes of various series, Greer may be best remembered as series regular Mr. Jonas in Gunsmoke, as Coach Ossie Weiss in the sitcom Hank, and as series regular Reverend Robert Alden in Little House on the Prairie. Greer may be better known to later audiences as the 108-year-old version of the character played by Tom Hanks in 1999's The Green Mile.

Early life
Greer was born in Fairview, Missouri, the son of Bernice Irene (née Dabbs), a speech teacher, and Randall Alexander Greer, a druggist. At the age of eight, he began acting in children's theater productions. He attended Drury University in Springfield, Missouri, where he was a member of Theta Kappa Nu.

Career
After moving to Pasadena, California, in 1943, he became an administrator and acting instructor at the Pasadena Playhouse.

His film debut was as an extra in the 1938 film Jesse James, which was filmed mainly around Pineville, Missouri. He told the Neosho Daily News in 2002, "They were paying $5 a day – a day! – to local people for being extras. That was really good money in those days, more money than we had seen in a long time." (The equivalent of $105 in 2022.)  

Greer appeared in three episodes of Adventures of Superman, including the inaugural entry, "Superman on Earth" (1952), in which he was cast as the first person ever to be saved by Superman. He was the major guest star as a man framed for murder in "Five Minutes to Doom" (1954) and as an eccentric millionaire in "The Superman Silver Mine" (1958).

Among hundreds of appearances in nearly 200 different television series, he played the role of the marshal in the two-part "King of the Dakotas" (1955) and as Ray in "Paper Gunman" of the NBC Western anthology series Frontier. In the 1956 movie Hot Rod Girl, he played the auto-repair shop owner Mr. Fry.

In 1957, he appeared in the episode "Revenge" of the syndicated crime drama Sheriff of Cochise and as Sanders in the episode "My Horse Ajax" of NBC's children's Western series Fury. He guest-starred about this time on the syndicated adventure series Whirlybirds and Rescue 8. He also appeared in an episode of Richard Diamond, Private Detective.

Greer was cast on the syndicated Western series Pony Express. He also guest-starred on three CBS Western series: Wanted: Dead or Alive, Trackdown, and Johnny Ringo.  Thereafter, he appeared in the NBC modern Western series Empire and also guest-starred on Stoney Burke.

Greer appeared in the 1957 episode "Ambush at Gila Gulch" of ABC's Tombstone Territory, the 1957 episode "Rebel Christmas" of the Tod Andrews syndicated series The Gray Ghost, and as Ed Grimes on the 1958 episode "312 Vertical" of the syndicated series State Trooper. He appeared, too, in It! The Terror from Beyond Space (1958).

His other appearances in 1959 included the episode "Peligroso" on NBC's Western series The Restless Gun, episodes of Bat Masterson, and the syndicated Man Without a Gun.

From 1956 until 1974, Greer had a recurring role as storekeeper Mr. Jonas on the long-running TV series "Gunsmoke". He appeared in 42 episodes of the series. Occasionally, he would play someone other than Mr. Jonas. In one episode, he was Chester's uncle.

In 1960, Greer appeared in the episode "Dark Fear" of CBS's anthology series The DuPont Show with June Allyson.

He was cast twice in The Twilight Zone, in the 1962 episode "Hocus-Pocus and Frisby" and the 1963 episode "Valley of the Shadow". Also in 1963, he was cast in a segment of Jack Palance's ABC circus drama The Greatest Show on Earth. 

He appeared as a creepy, corrupt policeman in the first episode of The Fugitive ("Fear in a Desert City", first shown in September 1963).  He returned for five more episodes, making him the most frequently cast guest actor of nonrecurring roles on the series (tied with Richard Anderson). 

The 1960s brought Greer several more recurring roles in popular series, such as track coach Ossie Weiss in Hank and Sheriff Norris "Norrie" Coolidge in The Ghost & Mrs. Muir. He also made eight appearances on the very popular series The Rifleman, playing both good-guy and bad-guy characters.

In 1962, on the ABC/WB Western series Lawman, in an episode titled "The Unmasked", Greer was cast in an entirely fictitious portrayal of Boston Corbett, the Union Army soldier who shot and mortally wounded John Wilkes Booth, the Abraham Lincoln's assassin.

In 1963, Greer was cast as Jack Tabor in the Perry Mason episode "The Case of the Skeleton's Closet". He guest-starred in seven other Perry Mason episodes. He portrayed, for example, a drunkard in "The Case of the Left-Handed Liar", a murderer in three episodes ("The Case of the Prudent Prosecutor". "The Case of the Lavender Lipstick", and "The Case of the Ice-Cold Hands"), and a murder victim in "The Case of the Fugitive Nurse". 

Greer can also be seen portraying a store owner wounded in a robbery in "The Black Flower", a 1964 episode of Arrest and Trial. That same year, he performed in "The Children of Spider County", an episode of The Outer Limits, in which he is the protective father of a country girl who is enamored with the son of an extraterrestrial. Later, in 1967, Greer then played an alien himself, posing as a Catholic priest in "The Experiment", an episode of The Invaders. 

As Reverend Alden, he had a prominent recurring role in the NBC series Little House on the Prairie from 1974 to 1983. Often cast as a minister, he performed the marriages of Rob and Laura Petrie on The Dick Van Dyke Show and Mike and Carol Brady on the first episode of The Brady Bunch. From 1992 to 1996, he tended to the spiritual needs of the townfolk in fictional Rome, Wisconsin, as Reverend Henry Novotny in Picket Fences. He also had a guest appearance on an episode of Charles in Charge in the role of Buzz Powell.

In the May 9, 1991 episode of L.A. Law, titled "On the Toad Again", he played a character addicted to a "high" produced by licking the skin secretions of psychoactive toads. In the 1997 film Con Air, Greer appeared as the old man discovered hiding under a pickup truck at "Lerner Field".

His final feature film was a prominent role as the 108-year-old version of the character played by Tom Hanks in 1999's The Green Mile, 61 years after Greer was an extra in the 1938 film Jesse James. Greer's last television performance was in a 2003 episode of Lizzie McGuire. 

Most of Greer's nearly 100 movie roles and nearly 600 television appearances had been in supporting roles, but he told the Albany Times Union in 2000 that "every character actor, in their own little sphere, is the lead."

In an interview in April 2003, Greer, a remarkably humble and kind man whose real persona can be seen in his many performances, as both a good guy and a bad guy (only with a dark "spin") said, "In 1949, I was teaching an acting class at the Pasadena Playhouse. I got a job as a gatekeeper in Anthony Mann’s The Reign of Terror. This was to demonstrate to the class a practical way of getting acting roles. It was so much fun. In the role, I was eating a chicken leg, and the director and I got along so well, that I found acting jobs afterward just kept coming my way. Not long after, that work became so lucrative that I no longer needed to teach. So, I gave up the one and became an actor, full time.”

In response to why he never got a nomination for his remarkable, sensitive performance in The Green Mile, though many thought it was worthy of a best supporting actor, if not a best actor nomination, Greer gently smiled. "Tom was supposed to portray the older character. I thought he was wonderful in the film, but as far as I know, there was trouble with the makeup, so I was hired. I guess the studio didn’t want it known as a fact as having been done by someone else; it was better if all credit went to Tom as both the younger and the older characters."

Death
Greer, who had moved to Pasadena, California, in 1943, died on April 28, 2007, at Pasadena's Huntington Hospital after a battle with kidney failure and heart disease, not quite a month after his 90th birthday. He is interred in Peace Valley Cemetery in
McDonald County, Missouri.

Filmography

Film

Television

References

External links

 
 
 
 

1917 births
2007 deaths
People from Newton County, Missouri
American male film actors
American male television actors
People from Greater Los Angeles
Deaths from kidney failure
Drury University alumni
Male actors from Missouri
Western (genre) television actors
20th-century American male actors